Zborov is a municipality and village in Šumperk District in the Olomouc Region of the Czech Republic. It has about 200 inhabitants.

Háj peak is situated in the area which slope is used for skiing.

Etymology
The name is derived from the personal name Zbor.

History
The first written mention of Zborov is from 1464, when the village was sold to the Tunkl of Brníčko family as a part of the Šilperk estate. It was merged with the Zábřeh estate, which remained so until 1848.

References

Villages in Šumperk District